Whitehorse High School is located in Montezuma Creek, Utah. The school is in the San Juan School District, and serves grades 7–12.

In the 2017–18 school year, several organizations assisted Whitehorse High School students participate in programs promoting use of the Navajo language including the San Juan School District Bilingual Education Department and the Navajo Nation Johnson O'Malley Indian Education Committee.

References

External links
Whitehorse High School website
San Juan School District website

Public high schools in Utah
Schools in San Juan County, Utah